Double Trouble is the 25th book in the series The Hardy Boys: Undercover Brothers.  It was published on November 25, 2008.

References

2008 American novels
Aladdin Paperbacks books